The Swan 38 was designed by Olin Stephens and first launched in 1974. The first 9 hulls were fitted with in boom roller reefing and later boat with slab reefing with 116 boats built in total. There were two rig plans with one ton and a taller IOR Mk3 version also produced.

References

External links
 Nautor Swan
 Designers Website
 S&S Swan Owener Association

Sailing yachts
Keelboats
1970s sailboat type designs
Sailboat types built by Nautor Swan
Sailboat type designs by Sparkman and Stephens
Sailboat type designs by Olin Stephens